Ta Kyawt Hna Kyawt Tay Ko Thi is a 1971 Burmese black-and-white drama film, directed by Htun Nyunt Oo starring Win Oo, Tin Tin Mya and Cho Pyone.

Cast
Win Oo as Kyaw Swar
Tin Tin Mya as Wai Wai Soe
Cho Pyone as Thin Thin Htwe
Khin Lay Swe as Ma Aye Kyi

References

1971 films
1970s Burmese-language films
Films shot in Myanmar
Burmese black-and-white films
1971 drama films
Burmese drama films